Martin Gruber (born 1957) is a German director, choreographer and movement teacher for performing artists.

Education
Degree in Theatre and Music from the Ludwig Maximilian University of Munich. Training in Zenbodytherapy® and Triggerpoint Anatomy® with William Dub Leigh (USA), Functional Integration with Alon Talmi (Israel). Suzuki Training with Tadashi Suzuki in Toga-Mura (Japan). Judo, Aikido, Iaido, Hojo in Japan and Germany, 6th Dan in Aikido (Aikikai Hombu Dojo). Study in Butoh Dance with Kazuo Ono in Japan, Acting with Yoshi Oida.

Life
Martin Gruber works as a director and a choreographer. He is a professor for movement at the Ernst Busch Academy of Dramatic Arts in Berlin.  He has developed his own method of actor training and founded the Tami Method®, named after Alon Talmi.,

Martin Gruber’s impact on contemporary European actor training is important: In 1985 he introduced Aikido into actor training at the Otto Falckenberg School (Munich), in 1986 Suzuki-Training, and in 1993 August Everding invited him to develop the movement training for the then newly founded Bayerische Theaterakademie August Everding (Munich). Since then quite a number of his students have become teachers themselves and teach his methods both in universities in Germany and further afield. Many of his former students work successfully on stage, in film and on TV.

Basics of Actor's Training
Martin Gruber developed a new foundational method for comprehensive, interdisciplinary actor training inspired by Asian and western dance, martial arts as well as many of the concepts from structural integration and functional bodywork.
His method is based on three main aspects: Individual work on the student's posture, dialogical movement work with a partner and formal dynamic work with the collective. The training combines amongst other things neurophysiological understandings and techniques (held within the Talmi Method®), a modified approach to Tadashi Suzuki's training as well as Aikido and creates a comprehensive system.
In this way, his method can answer to the demands of an ever-changing theatrical landscape that is constantly searching for new modes of expression, whilst lending the skills necessary for the traditional theatre. The actor gains competence to access the whole plethora of theatre styles ranging from classical theatre to performance art.

Theater Laboratory
In 1986 Martin Gruber opened a training place for professional theatre groups and performing artists in a converted farm in Birach, Bavaria. The ZeltEnsembleTheatre directed by Otto Kukla and Crescentia Duensser was the resident company until 1992. Premiering Armut, Reichtum, Mensch und Tier (Hans Henny Jahnn); Figaro and Co; Ulenspiegel. Since 1995 there have been premiers in the Bavarian dialect for example Wir sind Gefangene (Oskar Maria Graf), Lena Christ, Die heilige Nacht by Joern van Dyck and Bettina Mittendorfer.
Teachers at Birach include Rena Mirecka (Jerzy Grotowski's Theaterlaboratory, Polen), Paco Gonzales (Familie Flöz); Marita Günher (Roy Hart Theatre, London), Prof. Alon Talmi (Israel), William Dub Leigh (USA), Nobuyuki Watanabe (Japan).

Teaching
 1993–1985: Movement Tutor, Otto Falckenberg Schule, Munich Kammerspiele.
 2005–1993: Movement and Acting lecturer, Bayerische Theaterakademie August Everding, Munich.
 Since 2010: Professor for Movement, Ernst Busch Academy of Dramatic Arts, Berlin.

Martin Gruber has given trainings at many international institutions e.g.  Ecole Supérieure d’Art Dramatique du Théatre Nationale de Strasbourg (Frankreich), Central Academy of Drama, Beijing, and Shanghai Theatre Academy (People's Republic of China), workshops for example at Westerdals Oslo School of Arts, Communication and Technology, Oslo (Norway), National School of Drama, Delhi (India), Mozarteum, Salzburg (Austria), Hochschule für Musik und Theater München, Mime Centrum Berlin, Berlin University of the Arts, ImPulsTanz Vienna International Dance Festival (Austria)

Directing
 1993: Autistenhochzeit (Alexander Wagner). Premiere: Gasteig Munich
 1994: Sklavnaja Markta. Project with students at the Bayerische Theaterakademie August Everding, Prinzregententheater Munich
 1997: Beijing lan – Peking ist blau. International and interdisciplinary theater project with actors, dancers, musicians and singers from Germany und China. Premier Yan Huang Art Gallery, Beijing (PRC).
 1998: Fest für Liebende in unglücklicher Konstellation (Susanne Goesse). Project with the Bayerische Theaterakademie. Premiere: Akademietheater (Munich).
 1998: Anstatt Rashomon (Susanne Goesse). Premiere: Theatre Ulm, 1998.
 2003: Monteverdi-Duelle. Interdisciplinary music theatre project, Munich Opera Festival.
 2004: Dialoge über die Liebe. Eine Straßenoper. International Hue Festival (Vietnam) June 2004, Temple of Literature, Ha Noi (Vietnam) Octobre 2004, Munich Opera Festival June 2004. Interdisciplinery music theatre project with opera singers, musicians and dancers from Germany und Vietnam.
 2006: Assistant Director: Die Bakchen (Euripides). Director: Dieter Dorn, Residenztheater Munich.
 2008: Sakkorausch (Elisabeth Reichart). Premiere, Schauspielhaus Salzburg, Austria.
 2014: Lavapolis/Friday in Venice (Michael Schindhelm). Transmedia Storytelling Project for the Venice Biennale of Architecture, Video: Robert Schuster, Lavapolis/Friday in Venice, edited by Michael Schindhelm, ZHDK Zurich University of the Arts Center for Cultural Publishing Studies: Zürich/Schweiz, 2015.

Movement Directing
 1987: Mann ist Mann (Bertolt Brecht). Director: Günther Gerstner, Munich Kammerspiele.
 1993: Der Sturm (William Shakespeare). Director: Dieter Dorn, Munich Kammerspiele. Part of the staging was working with especially manufactured life-sized puppets ('ghosts').
 1994: Elektra (Richard Strauss). Director: Dieter Dorn, musical director: Daniel Barenboim, Staatsoper Berlin.
 1996: Ithaka (Botho Strauß). Director: Dieter Dorn, Premiere: Munich Kammerspiele
 2000: Memory. Eine Videooper. Director: Otto Kukla, Premiere: Theater am Neumarkt Zurich (Switzerland). Other performances: Munich (Germany), Sarajevo (Bosnia), Teheran (Iran)
 2005: Wann wird es endlich wieder so, wie es nie war? Director: Joachim Meyerhoff. Premiere: Maxim Gorki Theatre, Berlin.
 2015: La Traviata (Giuseppe Verdi). Director: Dieter Dorn, musical director: Daniel Barenboim, Staatsoper Berlin. 
 2016: Transit Europa. An international cultural project. Director: Robert Schuster. Deutsches Nationaltheater Weimar (DNT), Kunstfest Weimar, Theater Freiburg, Schauspielhaus Bochum (all in Germany), La Filature Scène Nationale, Mulhouse (France), Kurtheater Baden, Theater Chur (both Switzerland).
 2018: Parsifal (Richard Wagner). Director: Dieter Dorn, musical director: Daniel Barenboim. Premiere: Festspielhaus Baden-Baden

Publications
 2015 Tongguo chuangzao xingxingwei chaoyue chengshi dadao gexinghua bioada (Ten days with Zhou Xinfang in Shanghai. Afterthoughts), in: Jihua jingju dashi Zhou Xinfang danchen 120 zhounian. Waiguo zhuanjia yanjiu wence (In Memory of the 120th Birthday of the Jingju Maestro Zhou Xinfang. A Collection of Research Papers by Foreign Experts), edited by Zhou Xinfang Arts Research Center: Shanghai 2015, pp. 10–15, with Susanne Goesse.
 2014 Der Körper in der Darstellenden Kunst - der Neutralkörper, in: Psychologische Medizin. Österreichische Fachzeitschrift für Medizinische Psychologie, Psychotherapie und Psychosomatik, Wien 3/2014, pp. 23–28
 2010 Formen bilden, Formen vernichten. In: Bernd Stegemann (editor): Lektionen 4: Schauspielen Ausbildung. Theater der Zeit, Berlin 2010, pp. 169–188.
 2002 Form und Wandlung. Schauspiel als Weg am Beispiel des Aikido und anderen Arten der Körperarbeit. In: Peter Schettgen (editor): Heilen statt Hauen. Aikido-Erweiterungen in Therapie und beruflicher Bildungsarbeit. Augsburg 2002, S. 117–134.
 2001 Formen bilden, Formen vernichten. Bemerkungen zu neuen Wegen in der Schauspielausbildung. In: Rollenunterricht, Sprecherziehung, Stimmbildung und Körperarbeit in der Ausbildung zum Schauspieler. Dokumentation der Arbeitstagung der Bayerischen Theaterakademie August Everding 27.–30. April 2000. München 2001, pp. 201–215.
 1999 Grammatik der Füsse und Stimme. In: Integration von Sprecherziehung, Liedgestaltung und Körpertraining in der Ausbildung zum Schauspieler. Dokumentation der Arbeitstagung der Bayerischen Theaterakademie 26.–29. März 1998. München 1999, S. 96–100; with Uwe Hollmach.

Symposium contributions and articles as PDF files
 Demigod or Servant – On the Vulnerability of the Actor. 2012 (symposium lecture; PDF; 121 kB).
 Abmessen der Handlungsräume. Erste Eindrücke nach dem Besuch der Bauhaus-Bühne. Mapping the Action Spaces. First Impressions After the Visit to the Bauhaus Stage. In: Theater der Zeit. 6/2011. Supplement to Prague Quadrennial 2011: Die Bühne als Raumapparat / The Stage as Space Apparatus, S. 2–3 (online).
 Formen bilden, Formen vernichten. In: Bernd Stegemann (editor): Lektionen 4: Schauspielen Ausbildung. Theater der Zeit, Berlin 2010, S. 169–188. (PDF).
 Form and Change: Acting as Path – based on the Example of Aikido and Other Types of Body Work. 2010 (PDF).
 Go and wash your plate or how to teach Aikido to human resources. 2003 (PDF).

Literature
 Susanne Goesse: Von China nach Japan in zwei Theaterstücken. In: Minima sinica. 1/2006, pp. 48–74.
 Wolfgang Lanzinger: Martin Gruber. Ein Großmeister des Theaters mit einem Hang zum Extravaganten. In: Dorfener Heimatbuch. Von der Stadterhebung bis ins 3. Jahrtausend. Band 1. Dorfen 2006, pp. 460–462.

Notes

References

External links
 Martin Gruber at Ernst Busch Academy of Dramatic Arts Berlin
 Martin Gruber at Theater der Zeit
 Talmi-Method® Bad Gleichenberg Leib oder Leben
 Fulton-Smith about Martin Gruber
 Martin Gruber Video of Aikido training in Stavropol 2011

1957 births
Living people
Academic staff of the Ernst Busch Academy of Dramatic Arts
German choreographers
Ludwig Maximilian University of Munich alumni